State Highway 79 (SH 79) is a state highway in the U.S. state of Texas that runs  from Throckmorton to the Oklahoma state line near Byers.

Route description
SH 79 begins at an intersection with US 183/US 283 in Throckmorton. The highway runs in an east-west direction until FM 926, east of Elbert. The highway turns northeast, running to Olney and Archer City. The highway enters Wichita Falls and almost immediately begins an overlap with US 281 on the Henry S. Grace Freeway. At the interchange with US 82/US 287, US 281 travels north to downtown while SH 79 travels to the east. Shortly after joining US 82/287, SH 79 leaves the highways and runs on the eastern edge of the city as the Waurika Freeway. SH 79 runs through Dean, Petrolia and Byers before entering Oklahoma as OK-79.

History
It was originally designated on August 21, 1923, from Wichita Falls to Olney, replacing a portion of SH 22. On October 11, 1927, it extended southwest to Throckmorton. On April 24, 1928, it extended northeast to the Oklahoma border. On April 24, 1933, the section from Olney to Elbert was cancelled, but restored on December 18, 1933. This section was completed by 1938. The section north of Wichita Falls was cancelled on July 15, 1935, but restored on February 11, 1937. The route was previously proposed as the northern sections of SH 22 and SH 23. The intersection of SH 79 and SH 25, in Archer City, was the location for the filming of movie The Last Picture Show in 1971.

Junction list

References

079
Transportation in Clay County, Texas
Transportation in Wichita County, Texas
Transportation in Archer County, Texas
Transportation in Young County, Texas
Transportation in Throckmorton County, Texas